Hillar Kareva (8 December 1931 Tallinn – 17 June 1992 Tallinn) was an Estonian composer.

In 1956, he graduated from Tallinn State Conservatory in composition speciality.

1966–1982, he taught music theory at Tallinn State Conservatory.

Since 1959, he was a member of Estonian Composers' Union.

His daughter is poet Doris Kareva.

Works

 Sonate nr. 1 for altsaxophone and piano op. 19
 Sonate nr. 2 for altsaxophone and piano op. 29 nr. 2
 Sonate nr. 3 for altsaxophone and piano  op. 30
 Elegy for altsaxophone and piano

References

1931 births
1992 deaths
20th-century Estonian composers
Estonian Academy of Music and Theatre alumni
Academic staff of the Estonian Academy of Music and Theatre
Musicians from Tallinn
Burials at Pärnamäe Cemetery